Parmenomorpha wasselli is a species of beetle in the family Cerambycidae. It was described by Carter in 1932. It is known from Australia.

References

Dorcadiini
Beetles described in 1932